G.703 is a 2016 ITU-T standard for encoding voice or data over digital carriers such as T1 and E1. G.703 provides specifications for pulse-code modulation (PCM). 

G.703 also specifies E0 (64kbit/s). For information about E0 audio see G.711.

G.703 is either transported over 75 ohm co-axial cable terminated in BNC or Type 43 connectors or 120 ohm twisted pair cables terminated in RJ48C jacks. The choice is carrier- and region-dependent.

References

External links 
 G.703 at searchNetworking.com
 G.703 at the Connectivity Knowledge Platform
 G.703 on Network Encyclopedia
 Physical/electrical characteristics of hierarchical digital interfaces REC-G.703/ at ITU.INT

ITU-T recommendations
ITU-T G Series Recommendations
Telecommunications-related introductions in 2016